The Wechsel Pass (elevation 980 m, 3,215 ft) is a mountain pass in the Austrian Alps, located between the Bundesländer of Lower Austria and Styria.

Along with the Semmering Pass, the Wechsel Pass is one of the most important connections between Lower Austria and Styria. Until the A2 Autobahn was built in the 1980s, it was the major highway between Vienna and Graz.

See also
 List of highest paved roads in Europe
 List of mountain passes

Mountain passes of the Alps
Mountain passes of Lower Austria
Mountain passes of Styria